Utica is a city in Macomb County in the U.S. state of Michigan.  The population was 4,757 at the 2010 census.

History 
The city now known as Utica was platted by Joseph Stead in 1817, who preferred to call it "Harlow."  Others referred to the city as "Hog's Hollow" or "McDougalville," until a few years later it was finally named Utica by settlers from New York, in honor of the city of the same name in that state.  This was common of settlers in this region, and is reflected in the names of nearby cities such as Rochester, Troy, and Livonia that are also named for New York cities.

By the 1940s, Utica was the center of a region of dairy farms and truck gardens. It had a flour mill and shipped rhubarb. Dodge Park a few miles south on the Clinton River was a state park.

As the 1950s progressed, Detroit auto companies began to build factories in neighboring Sterling and Shelby Townships and the surrounding area began a transformation to an industrial economy.

Utica boasts a small historic district centered on Cass Avenue and Auburn Road, but few of the buildings predate 1906, due to destructive fires in 1905 and 1906.

Geography

Utica is bordered to the south by Sterling Heights and to the north by Shelby Charter Township.

Demographics

2010 census
As of the census of 2010, there were 4,757 people, 2,218 households, and 1,245 families living in the city. The racial makeup of the city was 90.4% White, 1.9% African American, 0.5% Native American, 3.5% Asian, 1.9% from other races, and 1.8% from two or more races. Hispanic or Latino of any race were 3.8% of the population.

There were 2,218 households, of which 23.6% had children under the age of 18 living with them, 37.8% were married couples living together, 14.0% had a female householder with no husband present, 4.3% had a male householder with no wife present, and 43.9% were non-families. 38.0% of all households were made up of individuals, and 15.9% had someone living alone who was 65 years of age or older. The average household size was 2.13 and the average family size was 2.80.

The median age in the city was 41.7 years. 17.9% of residents were under the age of 18; 8.8% were between the ages of 18 and 24; 27.4% were from 25 to 44; 28.3% were from 45 to 64; and 17.4% were 65 years of age or older. The gender makeup of the city was 47.4% male and 52.6% female.

2000 census
As of the census of 2000, there were 4,577 people, 1,952 households, and 1,184 families living in the city. The racial makeup of the city was 93.77% White, 0.92% African American, 0.37% Native American, 2.56% Asian, 0.74% from other races, and 1.64% from two or more races. Hispanic or Latino of any race were 2.10% of the population.

There were 1,952 households, out of which 27.2% had children under the age of 18 living with them, 43.8% were married couples living together, 13.3% had a female householder with no husband present, and 39.3% were non-families. 34.2% of all households were made up of individuals, and 10.8% had someone living alone who was 65 years of age or older.  The average household size was 2.29 and the average family size was 2.96.

In the city, the population dispersal was 21.0% under the age of 18, 9.6% from 18 to 24, 31.7% from 25 to 44, 23.2% from 45 to 64, and 14.5% who were 65 years of age or older.  The median age was 37 years. For every 100 females, there were 92.9 males.  For every 100 females age 18 and over, there were 91.8 males.

The median income for a household in the city was $38,683, and the median income for a family was $57,156. Males had a median income of $36,912 versus $26,353 for females. The per capita income for the city was $21,615.  About 4.8% of families and 7.0% of the population were below the poverty line, including 6.7% of those under age 18 and 17.3% of those age 65 or over.

Education
Utica Community Schools operates public schools, including Utica High School, Eppler Junior High School Flickinger Elementary School, and Wiley Elementary School. They serve the communities of Sterling Heights, Utica, and Shelby Township.

Notable people
Duke Maas, Major League Baseball pitcher
Roda Selleck, painter and art instructor in Indianapolis schools
Craig Krenzel, quarterback for the Ohio State football team

References

External links

Office Website of the City of Utica
Utica Public Library

Cities in Macomb County, Michigan
Metro Detroit
Populated places established in 1829
1829 establishments in Michigan Territory